Sparks is the fifth studio album by Swedish band Sahara Hotnights, released on 25 February 2009 through their own record company Stand By Your Band.  The album consists of covers of songs by artists such as Foo Fighters, Cass McCombs, Dusty Springfield, and Aneka.

Track listing
"Wide River" (Chris McCarty, Steve Miller) – 2:27
"In Private" (Dusty Springfield) – 3:41
"Big Me" (Foo Fighters) – 3:58
"Mess Around" (Redd Kross) – 3:20
"Japanese Boy" (Aneka) – 3:44
"City of Brotherly Love" (Cass McCombs) – 6:09
"Calm Down" (Birdy) – 3:19
"Love Will Never Do (Without You)" (Janet Jackson) - 3:33
"If You Can't Give Me Love" (Suzi Quatro) – 2:56
"Be Forewarned" (Pentagram) – 3:24

Personnel
Maria Andersson  – Lead vocals, guitar
Jennie Asplund  –  guitar, backing vocals
Johanna Asplund  –  bass, backing vocals
Josephine Forsman  – Drums

References

Sahara Hotnights albums
2009 albums
Albums produced by Björn Yttling